The 24th edition of the annual Four Hills Tournament was won by East German Jochen Danneberg.

For the tenth time, three out of the four events were won by the same athlete. However, for the fourth time within six years, it was not enough to win the Tournament: Toni Innauer only placed 24th in Innsbruck and lost too much ground to his competitors.

Participating nations and athletes

Results

Oberstdorf
 Schattenbergschanze, Oberstdorf
30 December 1975

Garmisch-Partenkirchen
 Große Olympiaschanze, Garmisch-Partenkirchen
1 January 1976

Innsbruck
 Bergiselschanze, Innsbruck
4 January 1976

After his two victories, Toni Innauer only placed 24th (181.5 pts), losing over 30 points to his closest competitors and falling back to 4th place in the overall ranking.

Bischofshofen
 Paul-Ausserleitner-Schanze, Bischofshofen
6 January 1976

Final ranking

References

External links
 FIS website
 Four Hills Tournament web site

Four Hills Tournament
1975 in ski jumping
1976 in ski jumping